Adel Belal Mohamed Diab (born June 27, 1987), also known as Adel El Siwi, is an Egyptian professional footballer who currently plays as a left back for the Egyptian club El Gouna FC on loan from El Raja SC.

References

External links
Adel El Siwi at Footballdatabase

1987 births
Living people
Egyptian footballers
Association football defenders
El Raja SC players
Tala'ea El Gaish SC players
Egyptian Premier League players